Anatoli Fyodorovich Kapustinskii (29 December 1906 – 26 August 1960) was a Russian and Soviet chemist. He derived the Kapustinskii equation that allows an estimation of the lattice energy of an ionic crystal.

Biography
Kapustinskii was born in Zhytomyr, Russian Empire (now Ukraine). In 1914 he entered the Warsaw Primary Gymnasium, in 1922 he finished a Secondary School in Moscow. In 1923 he began his studies of chemistry at Moscow State University. He graduated there in 1929. From 1929 to 1941 he worked at the Institute of Applied Mineralogy in Moscow. During this time (1935) he worked in Western Europe and in the United States where he spent about six months working with Gilbert N. Lewis at the University of California.

Scientific career
 1933-1937: Professor and Director of the Department of Physical Chemistry of Gor'kii State University.
 1937-1941: Moscow Steel Institute.
 1941-1943: Kazan State University.
 from 1943: Department of General and Inorganic Chemistry of the D. I. Mendeleev Moscow Chemicotechnological Institute.
 1939: Corresponding Member of the Academy of Sciences of the Soviet Union.
 from 1946: Main editorial Board of the Great Soviet Encyclopedia.
 1960: Honorary member of the Polish Chemical Society.

Sources 

Obituary from Izvestiya Akademii Nauk SSSR
Centenary Article in Russian Journal of Physical Chemistry A, 2007, Vol. 81, No. 8, pp. 1352–1354.

1906 births
1960 deaths
Scientists from Zhytomyr
Corresponding Members of the USSR Academy of Sciences
Academic staff of the D. Mendeleev University of Chemical Technology of Russia
Moscow State University alumni
Academic staff of the National University of Science and Technology MISiS
Recipients of the Order of the Red Banner of Labour
Russian chemists
Russian physical chemists
Soviet chemists
Soviet physical chemists
Burials at Novodevichy Cemetery